Strigatella assimilis is a species of sea snail, a marine gastropod mollusk in the family Mitridae, the miters or miter snails.

The species name Mitra assimilis Garrett, 1873 has been declared a synonym of Vexillum (Pusia) crocatum (Lamarck, 1811)

Description
The shell size varies between 10 mm and 25 mm.

Distribution
This species occurs in the Red Sea and in the Indo-West Pacific.

References

 Cernohorsky W. O. (1976). The Mitrinae of the World. Indo-Pacific Mollusca 3(17) page(s): 486

External links
 Gastropods.com : Mitra (Strigatella) assimilis; accessed : 28 January 2011

Mitridae
Gastropods described in 1868